A hull number is a serial identification number given to a boat or ship. For the military, a lower number implies an older vessel. For civilian use, the HIN is used to trace the boat's history. The precise usage varies by country and type.

United States usage

Civilian use
For civilian craft manufactured in the United States, the hull number is given to the vessel when it is built and forms part of the hull identification number, which uniquely identifies the vessel and must be permanently affixed to the hull in at least two places. A Hull Identification Number (HIN) is a unique set of 12 characters, similar to the Vehicle Identification Number which is found on automobiles. In 1972, The United States Coast Guard was asked to create a standardized format for HINs to allow for better tracking of accidents and history of boats. This HIN format is as follows: The first three characters consist of the Manufacturers Index Code (MIC) and should only be letters. The following five characters are the unique serial number assigned by the Manufacturer, and can be a series of letters and/or numbers with the exception of the letters O, I, and Q (they can be easily mistaken). The last four characters determine the model and certification year of the boat. The HIN may be found on the aft of the vessel in the uppermost right corner. Also, the HIN may be stated on the title, registration, and insurance documents.

United States military
The United States Navy, United States Coast Guard, and United States National Oceanic and Atmospheric Administration employ hull numbers in conjunction with a hull classification symbol to uniquely identify vessels and to aid identification. A particular combination of hull classification and hull number is never reused and therefore provides a means to uniquely identify a particular ship. For example, there have been at least eight vessels named , but CV-6 uniquely identifies the World War II aircraft carrier from all others. For convenience, the combined designation, which is painted on the sides of the hulls, is frequently called the "hull number".

The official Navy Style Guide says that hull numbers do not include hyphens.

The U.S. Navy sometimes ignores the sequence of hull numbering. Next the Navy built the three Seawolf-class submarines SSN-21 through SSN-23.

Also, whenever warships are constructed in American shipyards for foreign navies, any hull numbers used to identify the ships during their construction are never reused by the U.S. Navy.  For example, the  guided missile destroyers that were built for the Royal Australian Navy in Bay City, Michigan, were given the hull numbers DDG-25, DDG-26, and DDG-27; but these hull numbers were not assigned to any American destroyers after the Australian Navy had changed those to its own identification numbers.

Several other new warships have been constructed in American shipyards for countries such as West Germany and Taiwan.  Guided-missile frigates were constructed in Portugal under military-assistance aid packages were given the hull numbers DEG 7 through 11.

When a naval vessel is modified for use as a different type of ship, it is often assigned a new hull number along with its new classification. Often the actual number remains the same while the hull classification changes. For example, a heavy cruiser (CA) that was converted into a guided missile cruiser became a CG and its number was changed.

Also, during World War II, nine Cleveland-class light cruisers (CL) were converted to light aircraft carriers (CVL), with different numbers.

During the 1970s, the guided missile frigates that were then redesignated as guided missile cruisers had their designations changed from DLG to CG; in this case, they kept their previous numbers.  Some other guided-missile frigates were redesignated as guided missile destroyers (DDG) and given new numbers.

Hull numbers have been used to identify armored tanks for the U.S. Army and the U.S. Marine Corps, and other military services, also.

European usage
In Europe, ships are given a Craft Identification Number (CIN) or Hull Identification Number (HIN), standardised as EN ISO 10087:2006. The numbers are a permanent, unique, fourteen-digit alphanumeric identifier issued to all marine vessels in Europe. The numbering system is mandated by the European Recreational Craft Directive and descended from the American system. Larger vessels over 300 gross tons also receive a permanent international IMO ship identification number, and European vessels over 20 metres receive a permanent ENI number.

An example CID/HIN might appear as "GB-ABC00042-A8-99", where "GB" is the ISO 3166-1 country code, "ABC" would be the Acme Boat Company's Manufacturer Identity Code (MIC); "00042" would be the forty-second hull constructed by the organisation; "A8" would be January 1998 for the date keel was laid to the nearest month and "99" denoted as the year 1999 as the particular model year.  Months are denoted from A…L for January…December.

In the United Kingdom, the British Marine Federation manage the issuing of Manufacturer Identity Code on behalf of the British Department for Business Innovation and Skills. Amateur boat builders in the United Kingdom may apply for one-off HIN from the Royal Yacht Association who will issue one number from their "GB-RYAxxxxx" range.

Russia

The hull number in Russian is known as bortovoi nomer. During the 2014 Russian invasion of Ukraine all hull numbers were painted over in order to conceal presence of the Russian regular army troops in Ukraine.

See also
 Pennant number
 Tail number

References

 United States Code of Federal Regulations, Title 33.
 USS Enterprise (CV-6) website
 Hull numbers for surviving Tiger tanks
 HIN decoder and Verification Tool for Civilian Use

Ship identification numbers